Jordan Hand is an English former professional rugby league footballer who last played for Whitehaven in Kingstone Press League One.

Hand played for St Helens in the Super League. He was signed as a youngster from a local side, Bold Miners. From the 2016 season, he played for Swinton Lions at blind-side prop (No. 10). In April 2017, he was transferred to Rochdale Hornets.

References

External links
Saints Heritage Society profile

1993 births
Living people
English rugby league players
Rochdale Hornets players
Rugby league players from St Helens, Merseyside
Rugby league props
St Helens R.F.C. players
Swinton Lions players
Wakefield Trinity players
Whitehaven R.L.F.C. players